Paenarthrobacter aurescens is a bacterium species from the genus Paenarthrobacter . Paenarthrobacter aurescens produces nitrilase and L-N-carbamoylase. Paenarthrobacter aurescens has a low GC-content and has the ability to utilize anethole.

Further reading

References

External links
Type strain of Arthrobacter aurescens at BacDive -  the Bacterial Diversity Metadatabase

Bacteria described in 1953
Micrococcaceae